A Man Must Live is a 1925 American silent adventure film directed by Paul Sloane and written by James Ashmore Creelman based upon the novel Jungle Law by I. A. R. Wylie. The film stars Richard Dix, Jacqueline Logan, George Nash, Edna Murphy, Charles Byer, and Dorothy Walters. The film was released on January 19, 1925, by Paramount Pictures.

Plot
As described in a review in a film magazine, back from World War I and finding a soldier's welcome, Geoffrey Farnell (Dix), while waiting the outcome of a lawsuit against a corporation, finds an uncongenial place on the staff of a scandal-hunting newspaper. Editor Job Hardcastle (Nash) gives Geoffrey a warning that his stories lack the hectic pep that his readers demand. He is sent to find a racy society divorcee 'Mops' Collins (Logan) who has sunk to the level of working as a  cabaret dancer at a cheap concert hall. He finds her begging the manager (Ricciardi) not to send her off to a hospital to die. Geoffrey is touched with pity, and when she staggers to the street in her scanty stage costume, he takes her to his apartment. Reporting a failure to get the story to Hardcastle, he promises that he will turn up a real story if given one more chance. He finds this chance when a war-time buddy Clive Ross-Fayne (Beyer), shell shocked and devoid of recollection of his personality, is brought into court on charges of being a dope peddler. Believed to be dead and posthumously decorated for valor, it would make a sensation to identify this wreck as the lamented hero. However, Geoffrey loves the man's sister Eleanor (Murphy). He holds off until he is forced to give up the story to obtain the money that will keep his helpless charge out of the hospital. Then, in a fit of remorse, he seeks to stop publication of the story with a fight, but in vain. As he faces arrest for his assault on the editor, the young woman comes to denounce him, and the friendless waif lies dead in the next room. In an irony of fate, his suit is settled and he comes into his fortune too late to prevent his shame. However, Eleanor understands, the editor is abashed, and the happy ending comes at last.

Cast

Preservation
With no prints of A Man Must Live located in any film archives, it is a lost film.

References

External links

Lobby cards and still at richarddix.org

1925 films
American adventure films
1925 adventure films
Paramount Pictures films
American black-and-white films
American silent feature films
Films directed by Paul Sloane
1920s English-language films
1920s American films
Silent adventure films
English-language adventure films